The area of Oeschinen Lake and Kander river valley in Switzerland have been subject of multiple large landslides during the Holocene. Both the number and timing of landslides is controversial, with the most recent estimates stating that the large Kander landslide occurred about 3,210 years ago and the smaller Oeschinen Lake landslide 2,300 years ago. Both may have been caused by earthquakes, and the latter landslide generated the Oeschinen Lake. More recent landslides have occurred, and unstable rock masses occur in the landslide area.

Geographical context and importance 

Large landslides that block entire valleys are a considerable hazard in mountainous regions, in particular when they form highly unstable dams on rivers; the breach of such a dam on the Dadu River in China in 1786 caused a flood that killed 100,000 people. On the other hand, such landslides can generate spectacular landscapes, such as the glaciated terrain around Oeschinen Lake in Switzerland which has drawn tourists since 150 years and is now part of the Jungfrau-Aletsch protected area. Climate variations can cause slope instabilities and with global warming scientific interest in large collapses of mountains has risen. Giant landslides in the Alps are commonly related to the destabilizing effects of ice retreat at the end of the ice ages, but the landslides often occur millennia after the retreat of ice, suggesting that additional triggers such as climate variations and earthquake activity - perhaps in turn caused by deglaciation - are necessary to actually cause collapses.

It receives inflow from glaciers and springs, while its waters eventually seep through landslide debris although in the past (before a small dam was built) the lake periodically overflowed. The mountains are largely formed by various formations of Mesozoic rocks, which are mostly limestones with marls and sandstones; their layered structure and the weakness of the marl layers facilitates the development of landslides.

Collapses 

Multiple landslides and collapses have occurred in the Oeschinen area, including the Kandertal and Oeschinensee collapses; both landslides left debris at the outlet of the Oeschinensee. Apart from the two large landslides, avalanches, rockfalls and debris flows have left smaller deposits. A pre-Kandertal landslide has been identified in drill cores.

Kandertal

It dammed the Kander River, generating a lake in the area of present-day Kandersteg which broke 200–300 years after the landslide and generated an outburst flood and debris flow, redepositing landslide debris as far as Frutigen. A more recent interpretation in 2020 is that no lake was formed. It is possible that winds generated by the landslide blew down forests, and sparks from moving rocks ignited wildfires.

Computer simulations indicate that the collapse occurred over a timespan of about two minutes, and the  debris first descended into the Kander valley and then proceeded northwards. The emplacement would have taken about ten minutes. During its later stages, the northern part of the landslide incorporated wet sediments from the Kander valley and began to collapse, forming extensional features such as the ridges at Blausee.

The Fisistock collapse area forms a box-shaped depression, whose western headwall reaches  height while the eastern one is less conspicuous. At Kandersteg, the landslide debris forms the Uf der Höh hill, which is cut by secondary scarps, and which formed when the landslide hit the opposite valley flanks. The debris deposit is formed by large blocks up to several metres wide, with spaces often filled in by later soils. The terrain features hummocks and ridges perpendicular to the slide direction. Some groundwater-fed lakes such as Blausee lie within the debris deposit. Undulating terrain at the end of the landslide deposit suggest that it behaved like a fluid there.

The Kandertal landslide was originally interpreted to have occurred 9,600 years ago, at a time where numerous giant landslides happened in the Austrian and Swiss Alps and a possibly earthquake-related group of landslides south of Kandersteg. More recent research in 2020 however implies that it actually occurred 3,210±220 years ago, at a time where a change on climate and an expansion of glaciers in the area of the landslide was taking place. Lake sediments indicate the occurrence of a large earthquake about 3,300 years ago, which, while not necessarily directly causing the landslide, may have destabilized the slopes that later failed.

Oeschinensee

While the Oeschinensee collapse was once considered to have been contemporaneous with the Kandertal avalanche, research published in 2018 indicates that it actually occurred only 2,300±1,200 years ago. The landslide took place just before historical times in Switzerland, but sediments in lakes have shown evidence of earthquakes during that time that could have caused the collapse. While glacial erosion that undercuts valley slopes is necessary to cause landslides, often additional triggers such as earthquakes are necessary to actually trigger the collapse.

The slide crossed the Oeschinen valley and ran up the opposite slope and down the valley. After about one minute the collapse was complete.

The landslide left a conspicuous slide surface bordered by high cliffs. The deposits feature large boulders and hummocky topography. How the landscape looked like before the collapse is unclear but a volume of  has been estimated on the basis of plausible reconstructions both of the source area and the landslide deposit. The landslide blocked the valley and created Oeschinen Lake, although it is possible that the earlier landslide left an earlier lake or swamp.

Post-Oeschinensee collapses

Lake sediments in Oeschinen Lake show evidence of turbidites, some of which could be related to collapses caused by earthquakes. A number of collapse scarps lie on the mountains surrounding the lake and could have been the source of landslides. At least six such collapses took place. Some of the collapses may have occurred in historical times; a flood from the lake in 1846 AD may have been caused by an unobserved landslide.

Future collapses

The headwalls of the Kandertal landslide are still unstable.

Research history 

The landslide deposits were originally interpreted as glacial deposits, before outcrops investigated during the construction of railroads led to the discovery of the Kandertal landslide in 1897 or 1909. Over the 20th and 21st century, different estimates on the number, ages, causes and volumes of the landslide deposits have been made. A major source of uncertainty is how to separate distinct landslide deposits; usually, the Oeschinensee landslide was considered a single event.

References

Sources 

 
 
 
 
 
 

Landslides in Switzerland
Kander (Aare) basin
Holocene